André Cassagnes (September 23, 1926 – January 16, 2013) was a French inventor, electrical technician, toymaker, and kite designer. Cassagnes is best known as the inventor of the Etch A Sketch, a popular  mechanical drawing toy manufactured since 2016 by Spin Master, formerly by the Ohio Art Company.

Cassagnes was born outside Paris, France, on September 23, 1926. His parents owned and operated a bakery, where he worked as a teenager. An allergy to flour forced him to seek another line of work, and he became an electrician for the Lincrusta Company, a French manufacturer which produced picture frame covers using an aluminum powder.

In one instance, Cassagnes was performing a routine installation of a factory light switch plate. The plate was wrapped in a translucent decal covering. During the installation, Cassagnes removed the decal and wrote on it with a pencil. He quickly noticed that image transferred to the opposite face of the decal. Cassagnes tinkered with his discovery, which led to the world's first prototype of the Etch A Sketch. He called his invention L'Ecran Magique, which is translated as "the Magic Screen." The toy was first unveiled in 1959 at the Nuremberg Toy Fair in Nuremberg, West Germany. Cassagnes later partnered with the American manufacturer Ohio Art Company to further develop the Etch a Sketch into its familiar form. The Ohio Art Company launched the Etch a Sketch in the United States during the 1960 holiday season.
 
Cassagnes was also a well known kite designer and inventor in France. This was his main occupation but remained a hobby; he specialized in the creation of original modular kites throughout the 1980s. A 1992 article in Kite Lines magazine described him then as "the most famous kitemaker in France." He also invented several mechanical games: the Teleguide, which guides metal cars onto a track; and the SkeDoodle, a conceptual toy in which users draw images onto a globe-shaped screen.

Cassagnes died in a suburb of Paris on January 16, 2013, at the age of 86, according to a report from the Toy Industry Association (TIA). He was survived by his wife, Renée, and their three children.

References

1926 births
2013 deaths
French electrical engineers
20th-century French inventors
Kite fliers
Toy designers
Toy inventors